The 2020–21 Vijay Hazare Trophy was the 19th season of the Vijay Hazare Trophy, a List A cricket tournament in India. It was contested by 38 teams, divided into six groups, with six teams in Group D. Delhi, Himachal Pradesh, Maharashtra, Mumbai, Puducherry and Rajasthan were placed in Group D, with all the matches taking place in Jaipur. Mumbai won Group D to qualify for the knockout stage of the tournament. Delhi finished as the third-best runners-up, advancing to the Eliminator match against Uttarakhand.

Points table

Fixtures

Round 1

Round 2

Round 3

Round 4

Round 5

References

Vijay Hazare Trophy
Vijay Hazare Trophy